The 2015 FIBA Under-19 World Championship (Greek: Παγκόσμιο Πρωτάθλημα FIBA Under-19 2015) was the 12th edition of the FIBA U19 World Championship, the biennial international men's youth basketball championship contested by the U19 national teams of the member associations of FIBA. It was hosted by Heraklion, Greece, from 27 June to 5 July 2015.
It was the third time that Greece hosted the tournament since 1995.

As a result of FIBA rules changes, made effective as of 1 October 2014, this tournament marked the first time that the FIBA Under-19 World Championship used instant replay to review controversial plays and where players were allowed to wear any jersey with numbers from "00" to "99".

The United States won their sixth title by defeating Croatia 79–71 in the final.

Venues

Qualified teams

Preliminary round
The draw for the tournament was held on 12 March 2015.

All times are local (UTC+3).

Group A

Group B

Group C

Group D

Knockout stage

Bracket

5–8th place bracket

9–12th place bracket

13–16th place bracket

All times are local (UTC+3).

Round of 16

9–16th place quarterfinals

Quarterfinals

13–16th place semifinals

9–12th place semifinals

5–8th place semifinals

Semifinals

15th place game

13th place game

Eleventh place game

Ninth place game

Seventh place game

Fifth place game

Bronze medal match

Final

Final standings

Statistics and awards

Statistical leaders

Points

Rebounds

Assists

Blocks

Steals

Awards

All-Tournament Team
  Jalen Brunson
  Tyler Dorsey
  Furkan Korkmaz
  Harry Giles
  Marko Arapović

References

External links
 Official website

2015
FIBA Under-19 World Championship
FIBA Under-19 World Championship
Sport in Heraklion
International youth basketball competitions hosted by Greece